The Bible Methodist Connection of Churches is a Methodist denomination within the conservative holiness movement.

History 

The movement which would become Bible Methodist Connection of Churches began in the mid-18th century within the Church of England. A small group of students, including John Wesley, Charles Wesley and George Whitefield, met on the Oxford University campus. They focused on Bible study, methodical study of scripture and living a holy life. Other students mocked them, saying they were the "Holy Club" and "the Methodists", being methodical and exceptionally detailed in their Bible study, opinions and disciplined lifestyle. Eventually, the so-called Methodists started individual societies or classes for members of the Church of England who wanted to live a more religious life.

In 1735, John and Charles Wesley went to America, hoping to teach the gospel to the American Indians in the colony of Georgia. Instead, John became vicar of the church in Savannah.  His preaching was very legalistic and full of harsh rules, and the congregation rejected him.  After two years in America, he returned to England dejected and confused.  On his journey to America, he had been very impressed with the faith of the Moravians on board, and when he returned to England he spent time with a German Moravian who was passing through England, Peter Böhler.  Peter believed a person is saved through the grace of God, and John had many conversations with Peter about this topic. On May 25, 1738, after listening to a reading of Martin Luther's preface to Romans, John felt complete peace and the assurance of faith.  In less than two years, the "Holy Club" disbanded. John Wesley met with a group of clergy.   He said "they appeared to be of one heart, as well as of one judgment, resolved to be Bible-Christians at all events; and, wherever they were, to preach with all their might plain, old, Bible Christianity". The ministers retained their membership in the Church of England. Though not always emphasized or appreciated in the Anglican churches of their day, their teaching emphasized salvation by God's grace, acquired through faith in Christ. Three teachings they saw as the foundation of Christian faith were:

 People are all by nature dead in sin.
 They are justified by faith.
 Faith produces inward and outward holiness.

Very quickly these Methodist clergymen became popular, attracting large congregations.

The first official organization in the United States occurred in Baltimore, Maryland, in 1784, with the formation of the Methodist Episcopal Church at the Christmas Conference with Francis Asbury and Thomas Coke as the leaders.

Though John Wesley originally wanted the Methodists to stay within the Church of England, the American Revolution decisively separated the Methodists in the American colonies from the life and sacraments of the Anglican Church. In 1784, after unsuccessful attempts to have the Church of England send a bishop to start a new Church in the colonies, Wesley decisively appointed fellow priest Thomas Coke as superintendent (bishop) to organize a separate Methodist Society. Together with Coke, Wesley sent The Sunday Service of the Methodists, the first Methodist liturgical text, as well as the Articles of Religion which were received and adopted by the Baltimore Christmas Conference of 1784, officially establishing the Methodist Episcopal Church. The conference was held at the Lovely Lane Methodist Church, considered the Mother Church of American Methodism.

The new Church grew rapidly in the young country as it employed circuit riders, many of whom were lay preachers, to travel the mostly rural nation by horseback to preach the Gospel and to establish churches until there was scarcely any village in the United States without a Methodist presence. With 4,000 circuit riders by 1844, the Methodist Episcopal Church rapidly became the largest Protestant denomination in the country.

In 1843, Methodists who favoured abolitionism initiated a schism with the Methodist Episcopal Church, leading to the formation of the Wesleyan Methodist Church. In this new denomination, the "Episcopal form of government inherited from Wesley and Anglicanism, was replaced with a loose connection of societies or churches which characterized the Methodist movement in its earliest days".

In 1943, the General Conference of the Wesleyan Methodist Church recommended the strengthening of the “central supervisory authority to oversee the work of our Church.” The Wesleyan Methodist Church adopted a proposal in 1966 to merge with the Pilgrim Holiness Church, thus forming the Wesleyan Church; those who strongly disagreed with the merger, as well as the trend of greater centralization, formed the Bible Methodist Connection of Churches.

In 1994, the United Holiness Church, which broke from the Free Methodist Church in 1955, joined the Bible Methodist Connection of Churches.

In 2019, the Pilgrim Nazarene Church merged into the Bible Methodist Connection of Churches.

Educational institutions and camps 
The Bible Methodist Connection of Churches operate one Christian school, three family camps, and three youth camps.

Seminarians attend God's Bible School and College in Cincinnati and Hobe Sound Bible College in Hobe Sound.

See also 

Allegheny Wesleyan Methodist Connection
Bible Methodist Connection of Tennessee
Primitive Methodist Church
Interchurch Holiness Convention

References

External links 
Bible Methodist Connection of Churches

Methodism in the United States
Methodist denominations established in the 20th century
Methodist denominations in North America
Holiness denominations
1967 establishments in the United States